The Laurence Olivier Award for Best Performance in a Supporting Role in a Musical was an annual award presented by the Society of London Theatre in recognition of achievements in commercial London theatre. The awards were established as the Society of West End Theatre Awards in 1976, and renamed in 1984 in honour of English actor and director Laurence Olivier.

This commingled actor/actress award was introduced in 1991, presented through to 2014, then in 2015 was replaced by newly created awards for Best Actor in a Supporting Role in a Musical and Best Actress in a Supporting Role in a Musical.

On the 24 occasions that this commingled actor/actress award was given, it was presented 13 times to an actress, 10 times to an actor, and once to "The Chorus".

Winners and nominees

1990s

2000s

2010s

Multiple awards and nominations for Best Performance in a Supporting Role

Awards
Two awards
Tracie Bennett
Jenny Galloway

Nominations
Three nominations
Tracie Bennett
Sharon D. Clarke
Jenny Galloway

Two nominations
Josefina Gabrielle
Sheila Hancock
Katherine Kingsley
Siân Phillips
Clive Rowe
Summer Strallen

See also
 Drama Desk Award for Outstanding Featured Actor in a Musical
 Drama Desk Award for Outstanding Featured Actress in a Musical
 Tony Award for Best Featured Actor in a Musical
 Tony Award for Best Featured Actress in a Musical

References

External links
 

Laurence Olivier Awards
Theatre acting awards